Florian Merrien (born 21 November 1984) is a French para table tennis player who is a double World champion, six time European champion, 20-time French national champion and triple Paralympic medalist. He has won team titles with Nicolas Savant-Aira, Gregory Rosec and Jean-Philippe Robin. He was paralysed aged 18 months after contracting a virus that affected his spinal cord.

References

External links 
 
 

1984 births
Living people
Sportspeople from Seine-Maritime
Paralympic table tennis players of France
Table tennis players at the 2008 Summer Paralympics
Table tennis players at the 2012 Summer Paralympics
Table tennis players at the 2016 Summer Paralympics
Medalists at the 2008 Summer Paralympics
Medalists at the 2012 Summer Paralympics
Medalists at the 2016 Summer Paralympics
French male table tennis players
Paralympic medalists in table tennis
Paralympic gold medalists for France
Paralympic bronze medalists for France
Table tennis players at the 2020 Summer Paralympics
21st-century French people
20th-century French people